Kaysia Christina Schultz (born 17 April 1997) is a Guyanese cricketer who currently plays for Guyana and Guyana Amazon Warriors as a slow left-arm orthodox bowler. Schultz was born in Bartica, Guyana, and began playing cricket when she was ten.

In August 2020, she was named in the West Indies' squad for the Women's Twenty20 International (WT20I) series against England, earning her maiden call-up to the national team. She was one of five Guyanese cricketers to be named in the squad for the tour to England. In May 2021, Schultz was awarded with a central contract from Cricket West Indies. In June 2021, Schultz was named in the West Indies A Team for their series against Pakistan.

In January 2022, Schultz was named in the West Indies' Women's One Day International (WODI) squad for their series against South Africa. In February 2022, she was named as one of three reserve players in the West Indies team for the 2022 Women's Cricket World Cup in New Zealand. She made her One Day International debut on 9 December 2022, against England.

References

External links

1997 births
Living people
People from Cuyuni-Mazaruni
Guyanese women cricketers
West Indian women cricketers
West Indies women One Day International cricketers
Guyana Amazon Warriors (WCPL) cricketers